Andrew Kinnell (born 14 February 1947) is a Scottish retired professional footballer who played as a central midfielder, making 230 appearances in the Scottish League for Cowdenbeath. He also played league football for St Johnstone.

Honours 
Cowdenbeath
 Scottish League Second Division second-place promotion: 1969–70

Individual
Cowdenbeath Hall of Fame

References 

Living people
1947 births
People from Cowdenbeath
Scottish footballers
Cowdenbeath F.C. players
Scottish Football League players
Association football midfielders
Forfar Athletic F.C. players
Sauchie F.C. players
St Johnstone F.C. players
Dundonald Bluebell F.C. players